Charles Howerton (born June 24, 1938) is an American actor. He is best known for such films and television series as The Black Gestapo, Eat My Dust, Up from the Depths, Smokey Bites the Dust, Dr. Heckyl and Mr. Hype, and Assassination

An acting student of Daws Butler, Howerton has done voices on animated films and series such as G.I. Joe: The Rise of Cobra, Wolfen, and The Iron Giant.

Personal life
Howerton was married to actress Susan Howard from 1962 to 1964 until their divorce. They had one daughter, Lynn.
Howerton was married to actress Linda Gary until Gary's death in October 1995. They married on December 21, 1967 and had two daughters, Dana and Alexis. Linda Gary was also stepmother to Howerton's daughter from his previous marriage, Lynn Howerton.

Selected filmography

Confessions of a Police Captain (1971) - Gammino (English version, voice, uncredited)
Four Flies on Grey Velvet (1971) - Andrea (English version, voice, uncredited)
What Have You Done to Solange? (1972) - Phillip Sullivan (English version, voice, uncredited)
The Sicilian Connection (1972) - Blue-Eyed NYC Capo / Younger Ankaran Street Man (English version, voice, uncredited)
The Grand Duel (1972) - Philip Vermeer (English version, voice, uncredited)
The Fighting Fist of Shanghai Joe (1973) - Shanghai Joe (English version, voice)
The Black Gestapo (1975) - Joe
Eat My Dust (1976) - Dep. Jay Beah
Joyride to Nowhere (1977) - Sheriff Smith
Up from the Depths (1979) - Dr. David Whiting
Dr. Heckyl and Mr. Hype (1980) - Clutch Cooger
Cataclysm (1980) - (voice)
Wolfen (1981) - ESS Voice (voice)
Smokey Bites the Dust (1981) - Sheriff Bleed
Choices (1981) - Announcer
Assassination (1987) - President Calvin Craig
Programmed to Kill (1987) - Benedict
Chaplin (1992) - Dinner Guest #5
Batman: Mask of the Phantasm (1993) - (voice)
Drifting School (1995) - Martin
White Cargo (1996) - Ship Captain
The Iron Giant (2001) - (voice)
Cats & Dogs (2001) - German Shepherd at HQ (voice, uncredited)
Doctor Benny (2003) - Gary Fitz
The Work and the Glory (2004) - Second Land Agent
XXX: State of the Union (2005) - News Anchor (uncredited)
Demon Hunter (2005) - Inquisitor #1
The Onion Movie (2008) - Pentagon General
G.I. Joe: The Rise of Cobra (2009) - Foreign General #2
The Land of the Astronauts (2010) - Jack's father
The Assassination of Gianni Versace: American Crime Story (2018) - Elderly Gentleman (episode: "Alone")

References

External links

1938 births
Living people
20th-century American male actors
21st-century American male actors
American male film actors
American male television actors
American male voice actors
Male actors from Texas
People from Cuero, Texas